The 2016–17 Ohio Bobcats men's basketball team represented Ohio University during the 2016–17 NCAA Division I men's basketball season. The Bobcats, led by third-year head coach Saul Phillips, will play its home games at the Convocation Center in Athens, Ohio as a member of the East Division of the Mid-American Conference. They finished the regular season 20–10, 11–7 in MAC play to finish in a tie for second place in the East Division. As the No. 2 seed in the MAC tournament, they defeated Toledo before losing to eventual tournament champion Kent State in the semifinals.

Previous season

The Bobcats finished the 2015–16 season 23–12, 11–7 in MAC play to finish in second place in the East Division. They defeated Northern Illinois in the quarterfinals of the MAC tournament to advance to the semifinals where they lost to Buffalo. They were invited to the College Basketball Invitational where they defeated Albany and UNC Greensboro before losing to Morehead State.

Offseason

Departures

2016 recruiting class

Roster

Preseason
The preseason poll and league awards were announced by the league office on October 28, 2016.  Ohio was picked second in the MAC East.

Preseason men's basketball poll
(First place votes in parenthesis)

East Division
 Akron 194 (15)
 Ohio 190 (16)
 Buffalo 144 (5)
 Kent State 116
 Bowling Green 63
 Miami 49

West Division
 Eastern Michigan 178 (16)
 Ball State 158 (12)
 Northern Illinois 148 (5)
 Toledo 100 (1)
 Western Michigan 95
 Central Michigan 77 (2)

Tournament champs
Akron (15), Ohio (11), Eastern Michigan (3), Buffalo (2), NIU (2), Central Michigan (1), Kent State (1), Miami (1).

Preseason All-MAC 

Source

Schedule and results

|-
!colspan=9 style=| Exhibition

|-
!colspan=9 style=| Non-conference regular season

|-
!colspan=9 style=| MAC regular season

|-
!colspan=9 style=| MAC Tournament

Statistics

Team Statistics
Final 2016–17 Statistics

Source

Player statistics

Source

Awards and honors

All-MAC Awards 

Source

Rankings

See also
2016–17 Ohio Bobcats women's basketball team

References

Ohio
Ohio Bobcats men's basketball seasons
Ohio Bobcats men's basketball
2017 in sports in Ohio